Edith Anrep (16 September 1912 – 11 November 2012) was a Swedish lawyer and feminist. She served as the 7th President of the International Alliance of Women from 1970 to 1973. In Sweden she was President of the Fredrika Bremer Association Scholarship Institution, Vice-President of the Swedish Cancer Society and board member of the Swedish Committee for Cultural Cooperation on Europe.

References

Further reading
 

1912 births
2012 deaths
International Alliance of Women people
Swedish feminists
Swedish centenarians
Women centenarians